Jordan Mechner (born June 4, 1964) is an American video game designer, author, screenwriter, and filmmaker. He is best known for designing and programming the Broderbund Apple II games Karateka and Prince of Persia in the 1980s, the latter of which grew into a multi-platform franchise.

Early life
Mechner was born in New York City in 1964, into a family of European Jewish immigrants. His father is psychologist Francis Mechner, and his mother was a programmer. He attended Yale University in the 1980s.

Career
While at Yale, Mechner wrote several Apple II games that he submitted for publication, but which were rejected. Asteroid Blaster, an Asteroids clone, was submitted to Hayden Software and abstract arcade game Deathbounce to Broderbund. Mechner then spent two years at Yale writing his first published game, Karateka (1984), which went to number one on the Billboard software chart.

His second game, Prince of Persia, was released in 1989 after more than three years of work. He wrote both games in the 6502 assembly language for the Apple II, though that system was in decline through the late 1980s, and little new software was released by 1989. Initially, Prince of Persia sold poorly; however, as it was ported to other systems, sales increased. Eventually, it was adapted for nearly every computer and console platform.

Following the completion of Prince of Persia, Mechner took several years off from the gaming industry, during which he attended film school, wrote an unproduced screenplay, and traveled Europe for two years.

Mechner designed and directed the first sequel, Prince of Persia 2: The Shadow and the Flame, released in 1993. By then, he was focused on game design and story mechanics and was no longer programming.

He founded independent developer Smoking Car Productions in 1993, where he led the production of the CD-ROM adventure game The Last Express. Smoking Car grew to sixty people, a huge game development team for the mid-1990s, and the game took longer to finish than anticipated. When finally released in 1997, it was positively reviewed but sold poorly. The Last Express was re-released in 2012 by French publisher DotEmu for mobile and other platforms.

In 2017, Mechner won the Honorific Award at the Fun & Serious Game Festival.

Prince of Persia revival
In 2001, Mechner worked with Ubisoft to reboot Prince of Persia. Developed at Ubisoft Montreal with Mechner as game designer, writer, and creative consultant, Prince of Persia: The Sands of Time was released in 2003. It received twelve nominations and eight awards at the Interactive Achievement Awards (D.I.C.E.). Ubisoft has since published four more Prince of Persia sequels and several spinoffs.

Mechner became one of the few video game creators to adapt his own creation as a feature film, with Disney's Prince of Persia: The Sands of Time, produced by Jerry Bruckheimer, directed by Mike Newell, and starring Jake Gyllenhaal, Gemma Arterton, Ben Kingsley, and Alfred Molina. The film was released on May 28, 2010. Mechner wrote the first drafts of the screenplay and acted as executive producer.

Writing and directing

In 2003, Mechner wrote and directed the documentary film Chavez Ravine: A Los Angeles Story. It won the 2003 IDA award for Best Short Documentary, was short-listed for an Academy Award nomination, and received its broadcast premiere on PBS Independent Lens in 2005.

Mechner collaborated with a team on the 2008 Prince of Persia graphic novel. The author's graphic novel Templar was published in July 2013. Templar became a New York Times best-selling book and was nominated for an Eisner Award. Mechner also wrote the graphic novel Prince of Persia: Before the Sandstorm, to tie in with the release of the film in 2010.

Mechner has written a screenplay for a film adaptation of Michael Turner's Fathom for Fox Studios.

He has self-published two volumes of his game development journals from the 1980s, one describing the making of Karateka and the other focusing on Prince of Persia. He was able to recover the source code of the Prince of Persia game from recently found 23-year-old 3.5" Apple ProDOS floppy disks, and posted it online.

Works

Games

Bibliography

Filmography
 Waiting for Dark (1993)
 Chavez Ravine: A Los Angeles Story (2003)
 Prince of Persia: The Sands of Time (2010) (screenwriter)

Personal life
Mechner married Whitney Hills in 2014. The couple divorced in 2017.

References

External links

 
 
 
 Chavez Ravine: A Los Angeles Story

1964 births
American video game designers
Jewish American writers
Jewish video game developers
Living people
Writers from New York City
Yale University alumni
Game Developers Conference Pioneer Award recipients
21st-century American Jews